Soul Nomad & the World Eaters is a strategy role-playing game (SRPG), developed and published by Nippon Ichi Software. The game was initially released for PlayStation 2 on February 15, 2007 in Japan, September 25, 2007 in North America, and June 26 and 27, 2008 in Australia and Europe, respectively. It was later ported to Steam and Nintendo Switch (as part of the Prinny Presents NIS Classics Volume 1 compilation) and released worldwide in the August of 2021.

The game centres around the adventures of Revya, the gender-selectable silent protagonist, to defeat several sentient magical weapons, called the World Eaters, that were once commanded centuries earlier by Gig, the godlike "Master of Death". Gig, now sealed forcibly within Revya, is begrudgingly forced to lend them his power, although he attempts to tempt Revya down the path of evil. Critics positively received the game's story for its originality, but it was criticized for its lack of gameplay depth compared to other Nippon Ichi titles.

Gameplay
A key element of the game is customization, as the game is a strategy role-playing game, much like the majority of Nippon Ichi Software's games, giving the player many more options to choose from when progressing through the story. When the game begins, the player chooses the gender and name of the main character, a change from other Nippon Ichi games.

At the very beginning of the game the main character can become powerful enough to destroy even the final boss, but relying on Gig too much would be the equivalent of just letting the world be destroyed. Instead, the player is expected to build and train an army of units capable of handling whatever comes his or her way, relying on Gig's powers as little as possible.

The player is given the ability to create and command squads, which after enough time, will become an army capable of destroying the world he or she is trying to save. Up to 25 different character types can be created, each filling a unique position in the squad with its own strengths and weaknesses. Characters' individual abilities can do such things as increase the range of an effect or give each unit a bonus to its inflicted damage.

Tedious tasks like visiting the same area over and over in order to level new characters (a staple of older Nippon Ichi titles) are no longer necessary as any new units may be purchased up to the level of the main character. Also, unlike the older Nippon Ichi titles, the player is not allowed to return to older levels. Squads can also be merged in order to increase their power.

The game includes more options for interacting with Non-playable Characters (NPCs) than previous Nippon Ichi games. It is possible to steal items from shops or NPCs instead of buying them. Additionally, the player can attack the towns and fight against the NPCs inhabiting them.  Alternately, the player can recruit NPCs into her or his army.

Story

History of Prodesto

In the backstory of the game, at the end of a long war-shattered age, one man brought all the countries in the Continent of Prodesto together under his rule: Lord Median the Conqueror. Though only one man, he became renowned throughout the world for his heroism. However, within ten years, the empire Lord Median had created collapsed with the death of his son, quickly followed by his own death. With no apparent leader, the continent collapsed once more into civil war. Fifteen years later, Lord Median's daughter had proven herself as a true leader, and convinced the remaining countries to form peace treaties, establishing peace once more.

This peace collapsed 50 years later, however, when the "Master of Death" Gig, arrived with three giant beings known as World Eaters under his command.  They quickly devastated the land, annihilating entire nations in a matter of days, and it was not long before nations began abandoning their alliances and allying with the World Eaters in an attempt to save themselves.

When things looked their darkest, Layna gathered up what remained of her forces and made a direct assault against Gig, a battle which apparently killed both of them. With their leader gone, the World Eaters fell silent, apparently having gone to sleep, remaining as monuments of the destruction that occurred.

Starting your Journey

The game starts in the year 800 in the Tamaito calendar. 200 years have passed since the defeat of the shadow at the hands of the technique user Layna. Ever since that day, with the shadow's defeat, the giants known as "The World Eaters" have retained their silence in the continent. The body of one of the giants remains in the peaceful country of Raide, and serves as a symbol of fear to those who pass by it.

Within the country of Raide, there exists a small secluded village that refuses to acknowledge the existence of those from outside world. It is known as the "Hidden Village". In that village lives the protagonist along with their friend Danette, and other members of the Sepp race.  Along with Layna, whose age now exceeds 200, the protagonist helps to protect the village.

One day, the protagonist and Danette are called forth by old lady Layna and given weapons to help guard the village. Danette, who has always dreamed of protecting the village, is overjoyed and is given twin daggers. The protagonist is given a long black sword.

The moment the protagonist takes hold of the black sword, it begins to insult and swear at Layna. Both the protagonist and Danette are profoundly confused at this point. It is revealed that 200 years ago, Layna destroyed the shadow and sealed its soul into the black sword. The shadow goes by the name of Gig. To utilize the power of Gig, Layna chose to give this sword to the protagonist.

The protagonist is infused with the soul of Gig, gaining control of his power, and is now able to fight against the World Eaters, who have now reawakened. With Gig residing in our hero's body and Danette, who has been the hero's friend since he/she was young, the protagonist departs into the country of Raide to defeat the World Eaters.

The Demon Path
Soul Nomad is well known for its dark alternate mode, the demon path, which is accessed by choosing the "evil" dialogue options at the start of the game. In this route, Revya decides to use Gig's great power to essentially destroy the world, and strikes down both Layna and Danette at the game's outset. With Gig's eager assistance, the player controls Revya in his/her bloody rampage across the continent, as they become the tyrannical "Devourlord" and commit atrocity after atrocity against the people of Raide. Like the normal mode, the demon path has a number of different dialogue options and endings, as well as unique characters Revya can dominate (mostly villains) that are unplayable in the normal game.

Characters

Main characters

The player's character, he/she is the only one who can wield the Onyx Blade and can successfully fuse with Gig and make use of his powers. He/She does not have a voice during cut-scenes, but the player can choose certain responses during the game to advance the story. He/She does have a voice in battle. Depending on the relationship choices, the main character is seen with the character he/she has had the strongest relationship with at the end of the Hero storyline. In the Demon Story, if the hero wins the final battle, he/she will have killed everyone on the planet and revert to a power-hungry mindless creature that goes on to destroy the world of Drazil. The default name for the main character is "Revya".

This character is available as a download for Disgaea 3: Absence of Justice. This character in Disgaea 3 is female and goes under her default name "Revya". She is a humanoid unit whose only weapon forte is the sword.

She was also a nominee as downloaded content for Disgaea 4: A Promise Unforgotten, but did not receive enough votes.

The Master of Death who came to Prodesto 200 years ago with his three World Eaters. He was later sealed into a sword by Layna, and is eventually fused into the main character. The fusion allows the main character to use some of Gig's power and can ask Gig for more power, though he can lose his body to Gig if he does. He's known for being rather rude and prone to lying. In the Hero ending, he becomes reborn in his own body and goes off to find the hero and Danette. In the Demon ending, if the final battle is won, Gig loses control over the hero and becomes devoured, completing the fusion in the opposite way he desired. However, if the battle is lost, the brainwashing effect over him is destroyed, as he remembers his life as Master of Death Vigilance.

Before the game's events, Vigilance, as Master of Death, was tasked with guiding the souls of the dead to the afterlife. When he came for Revya's soul, he fought with Lord Median and was killed. His soul then went to Drazil, where he was transformed into Gig.

Along with Revya, Gig is available as a download for Disgaea 3: Absence of Justice. In Disgaea 3, he is a monster-type with the ability to Magichange (transform) into the Onyx Blade.

Additionally, he was also released as downloaded content for Disgaea 2: Dark Hero Days in both the United States and Japan, but due to a glitch occurring in the PSN Store, Gig is now only available for purchase in the Japanese version. Again, he is a monster-type with the ability to transform into the Onyx Blade.

Gig has also made an appearance as a DLC character in Disgaea 4: A Promise Unforgotten, and he holds the same stats as his last two appearances in the Disgaea series.

The protagonist's childhood friend. A Sepp, a race of bovine-like people, she tends to one-up the main character, despite having a poor memory. Her village was destroyed by a cult that worships the World Eater Thuris as a god.  Her parents were both killed by the cult and became Crimson Tears. One of the Tears was used to strengthen the seal on the sword containing Gig when the main character obtains the sword, and the other was used to seal Danette's memory. Throughout the game she threatens to snap various people's necks though she never actually does. She was tasked with following the main character and ensuring that Gig never took control if he ever did she was to use her other parent's Crimson Tear to further strengthen the seal. In the Demon Path storyline Danette joins the resistance against Gig wearing a suit of armour and going by the name the Silent Knight because she can't bear to speak with him after his transformation. When things seem futile she sacrifices herself to become a crimson tear to summon Layna from Drazil so they may have a better chance of defeating the Main Character and Gig. If you lose the final battle, the "Good" ending of the Demon Path has Dio of the Evil Eye use Danette's Crimson Tear to seal the Main Character into the sword Gig lived in till he can be redeemed. She refers to this as her chance to beat the good back into the Main Character.

Though she is not playable in Disgaea 3, she appears whenever Revya uses Holy Justice, their special combo attack in Soul Nomad.

A city guard of Astec. Despite being a strong fighter, he's often overprotective of his older sister, Euphoria. He is really the third World Eater. When Levin was eight he and his sister were acquired from the slave trading organization Yesterwind and were used as experiments. His sister's illness is a result of those experiments. Though he dies when the main character kills the third World Eater if his relationship is high enough he can still be used upon arriving in Drazil. Though it is never explained how he and his sister are both brought back to life at the end of the game. In the demon path storyline Levin is the first person to fight and survive against the main character's evil version and not die or be seriously injured so when the resistance is formed people flock to him.

A silent man who works with Levin. Aside from being a cleric, he's also an efficient spy, and can even surprise Gig. If not for the current state of the world, he'd have preferred to pursue a career as a chef.

Commander of all the Nereid land forces. She distrusts humans, but loves children, whom she cares for a young human boy who she spoils rotten. She is honest and straightforward with people, and places high value on pride and friendship.

An aging Redflank later met by the protagonist's group. He often complains about the Sepp people, which also includes remarks directed toward Danette and Levin. He used to live in the village where the Main Character and Danette grew up but left 10 years ago because he disagreed with Lady Layna on how to handle Gig, believing he shouldn't be used as a weapon, instead thinking Gig should be forever sealed in the sword. Though his worries have no validity in the normal story, the Demon path plays out just as he feared it would and he is found to have joined the resistance to stop Gig though he thinks tiny raids on Gig and the Main Character will only waste lives.

A young woman who is helping the town of Zazana fend off a group of bandits. Though kind-hearted, she's often naive and impulsive. She seems to share a history with Grunzford. She wears a pin she believes to have belonged to her mother but in actuality belonged to her older sister who now goes by the name Shauna. Her real family was one of the few that could afford the medicine to treat Scarlett Iago when it appeared 15 years prior to the game. Nearby villagers attacked her home looking for the medicine and her family got separated in the escape leading to her capture as an infant by the organization Yesterwind and eventual selling to the man she believes is her father. In the Demon Path she is raped and acts weird and later on she kills herself.

Odie
A Dracon who attempts to impersonate Dio of the Evil Eye. He's encountered multiple times throughout the game. He is the brother of Dio who it is learned is the name given to the oldest brother in a line of Dracon wizards. He is shunned by his family for his inferior skills and goes elsewhere, in the process recruiting a man and his two  to impersonate the three beings that are associated with Dio of the Evil Eye. After many defeats, he joins the main characters party and in the process becomes a better wizard. He knows Endorph and is friends with several angels.

Secondary characters

A mysterious man who was found by the Nereids fifteen years ago, his body covered in burn scars. He took over Shauna's bandit gang, reforming it into a group who act in a Robin Hood esque fashion. In addition, he taught the Angel race how to wield guns. Endorph is actually the character Walnut from Phantom Brave, who ended up on this world after forcing the demon Sulphur through a dimensional portal. Endorph seemingly destroys Raksha after the hero wins the battle. He uses Psycho Burgundy to attack the World Eater, but the cutscene ends there. Should the player get Endorph's ending, he is revealed to be alive, and living with Euphoria and their infant child. He is also vaguely referenced in Danette's ending, which mentions Euphoria's baby.

The former leader of a bandit gang, before Endorph usurped her position. She seems to hate everyone, especially the poor. Later on, it's revealed that she shares a bit of history with Tricia. When Thuris commits suicide and spreads the deadly Scarlet Iago disease with his death blast, she gives her cure to Tricia in order to save her. Without a cure for herself, she succumbs to the disease and dies in Tricia's arms. In the Demon Campaign she joins the Main Character out of hatred for Endorph and later takes care of the mentally broken Tricia until her suicide, at which point Shauna becomes an apathetic and nihilistic killer.

Grand Cordon of the Knights of Raide. Has two children; his first, named Richard was thought to be kidnapped by the Nereids. In actuality the King of Raide hired Lobo, the leader of Yesterwind, to kidnap Richard and give him to the Nereids as a payment for curing the Queen. Though never stated it is believed that Thorndyke became the Grand Cordon as a way to repay him. Upon discovering that Richard, now known as Penn, is alive and well in the care of the Nereids and that he enjoys living there he decides to let him stay with them. When it is brought to his attention that the King of Raide is in possession of a Crimson Tear, which is considered a forbidden item, he steals it from the King and presents it to the ruling council. He is then captured and killed in front of his own knights by order of the king for treason. It is his death that inspires Galahad and other knights to turn against Raide and rebuild the city after it is destroyed by the World Eater, Feinne. In the Demon path he attacks the Main Character along with the Nereids to save Penn and then turns himself over to ensure the safety of Penn. Kanan, who also works for the Main character in the Demon Path, finds a child that looks like Penn and forces Thorndyke to kill him. Believing he has killed his own son he goes insane and becomes a homicidal maniac for the remainder of the story.

Diness
The 12-year-old child queen of Orviska. Being the sole member of her family, she is forced to ascend to the throne, but takes advice from Dio of the Evil Eye. As a result, she becomes highly dependent on him, and is unable to make a decision without him. In the Demon Path storyline, she is separated from Dio and is forced to build up her confidence.

Cuthbert
Christophe's younger brother. Although he initially plays a small role at the beginning of the story, he is later discovered to have had a working relation with Lobo. When the two of them are cornered at Yesterwind HQ, Cuthbert betrays and kills Lobo, claiming that since his hands are already dirty, his brother (Christophe) should not have to sully his as well. Following this, he commits suicide. In the Demon Path storyline, Cuthbert reveals that he originally joined Lobo to raise money to buy medicine for Christophe. On a side note, Cuthbert has a fear of becoming bald.

A hotpod farmer who lives in the Orviska slums. He is recruited by Odie to pose as the Blazing Swordsman, Gestahl.

Kanan
The Dracon leader of the Thurist cult. Kanan was the one who led the assault on Pulkina several years ago, killing off many of the inhabitants, two of whom were Danette's parents. She is devoured by Thuris. In the Demon Path storyline, Kanan betrays Thuris and joins the main character. Vitali asserts that she is in fact male, which is further supported by Kanan's deeper voice during one of Danette's flashbacks, and her surprise at Danette recognizing her from Pulkina, as "[she] didn't even look like this back then." Her standard attacks are identical to that of generic female Dracons.

Layna
Also known as Layna the Firebrand, she is the one responsible for sealing away Gig into the protagonist's weapon.

Through the cutscenes in-game, it's revealed that some time before Layna took the throne, she sought out Virtuous, who killed Median in retaliation of killing Vigilance. During the fight, Virtuous convinced Layna to harbor her soul, which may have contributed to Layna's rise in power.

Then, when Gig came to Prodesto fifty years later, Layna fought him to a standstill and was killed, at which point Virtuous took over and sealed Gig away, being prepared to wait for 200 years until a soul worthy of wielding Gig's power came about. Layna's actual soul was sent to Drazil to act as a scout, taking down other Drazilians to free up souls.

Penn
The human boy currently under Nereid care. He is the son of the Grand Cordon of Raide and was kidnapped by Lobo of Yesterwind to be given to the Nereids as payment to heal the Queen of Raide when he was a baby. Though all of the Nereids are protective of him, Juno takes her duty very seriously and Penn often says when he gets older he plans to marry her, though he believes and states to her she needs bigger breasts. In the Demon Path he is given to the Main Character and takes to slaughtering with a passion even Gig finds disturbing. Though later he sides with Levin saying claiming he wants to follow the most powerful person.

Queen of the Nereids, an all female race of water-dwelling people. She is said to exhibit a special healing power that most humans can't make use of.

Christophe
He controls all trade throughout the Astec-Raide region. Though appearing jovial and cheery, he's often acting in a secretive manner. He employed Vitali as his personal spy and keeps tabs on the main character. It is later revealed that Christophe had a past with Lobo.

Levin's older sister. A joke about her in the game is her cooking, which, according to Vitali, could be used as a biological weapon. However, she also has a strong sense of hospitality, and offers to cook for people, most of all, Endorph.

A Sepp man who runs an organization called the Yesterwind. Christophe and Cuthbert seem to know him. In the Demon Path storyline, he quickly joins the main character after hearing tales of the brutality caused by him/her, though later on chooses to leave the group.

A Chevalier under Thorndyke's command. He seems suspicious about Thorndyke's ascent to his position. In the Demon path, he is rescued by Gig and the main character after they injure him in the crossfire of fighting a World Eater, however, the events of that battle, and the atrocities Gig commits cause him to go insane and believe himself a salesman.

A young angel who wears a pilot's hat and uses a gun he received from Endorph. He has a friendly relation to Odie. In the Demon Path storyline, he and all of the other angels are conscripted into forced labor by the main character before eventually being killed in front of Pinot.

An angel who's usually seen hanging around with Agrippa.

World Eaters

Feinne
She is the first World Eater that the main character and Danette come across. Feinne is the most powerful World Eater in Haephnes, as well as being the most inactive. Gig describes her as his favorite World Eater of the three.

Thuris
Thuris is the second World Eater that the main character encounters and is, physically, the weakest of the three. He has the ability to become invisible. Following the defeat of Gig, Thuris created the cult of Thurists by leading his followers into worshiping him as a god. When Gig converses with him, he tells Thuris that he had become more like a human. Later on in the story, he reveals that it was he who brought the plague of Scarlet Iago upon the world. Gig describes him as the most intelligent World Eater and the one he disliked the most. Upon his defeat, Thuris commits suicide by blowing himself up and spreading the disease Scarlet Iago as a result.

Raksha
The third and final World Eater, Raksha is initially found to be dormant. It is later revealed that he managed to, with the help of Dio, separate his spirit from his body and place it in Levin's as a child, lying low until he meets Gig once again. His goal is to become so powerful that nobody would ever be able to tell him what to do. Gig states that Raksha was "always the hardest one to crack", since he is physically strongest of the World Eaters. In the Demon Campaign he defeats the Main Character early on as Levin, thus causing people to rally behind him as a hero. Upon gaining his former body he chooses to fight against the Main Character, liking the attention he received as a hero.

Other characters

Lord Median
Lord Median was a war hero who ascended to the throne after uniting Prodesto beneath his rule. He ruled for ten years, before his sudden death caused Prodesto to fall back into ruin.

During that time, he had one son, Revya. However, Revya fell to the disease Scarlet Iago several years later, and died. Median, overcome with grief at losing his heir, was silently contacted by Drazil, who gave him the idea of killing the Master of Death in order to keep living. When Vigilance came to take Revya's soul, Median fought against him and killed him, setting Drazil's plan into motion.

Some time later, Median was killed by Virtuous, Master of Life, by having his soul taken from his body. His Onyx Blade, of which can only be wielded by members of his bloodline, was used to seal Gig, and was later given to the Protagonist.

He can be fought and recruited in an optional map.

Gestahl
A bandaged man who, along with the beasts Yavis and Parin, is inherited to the Dracon who takes on the name of Dio. Though he has power, he often tends to fall into a vegetative state, at which he must consume a soul in order to continue functioning (as seen in the Demon Path). At the end of the Normal Path, he's revealed to be a 200+ year old Lord Median. He allows himself to be consumed by the Onyx Blade in order to pass on his power.

Asagi
Asagi is a girl who was meant to be the main character of a future Nippon Ichi game, however this game possibly got scrapped, making her appear in various games as a post-game content, wanting to be the main character of the games where she appears. In Makai Kingdom: Chronicles of the Sacred Tome she becomes Zetta's apprentice in order to become stronger, after this she seems to have turned on Zetta and arrives in Soul Nomad during the fight against Feinne.

She, as she usually does, wants the spot as the lead character, calling herself the Queen of Games, but Gig prefers to ignore her and continue to fight Feinne. Asagi then gets upset and destroys Feinne with only a bazooka shot (amazing even Gig) stating that Feinne was the most pathetic end boss she has ever seen. Then she challenges Gig and the hero in a fight and during this battle she destroys the world with her power.

After this battle Asagi can be recruited. However, she starts to complain about her fate of being always an hidden character. Gig scolds her, since by destroying the world, she ended his story thus forcing him to start the game all over again.

Reception

The game received an aggregate score of 73/100 from Metacritic, indicating "mixed to average reviews".

Notes

References

External links

  
 

2007 video games
Disgaea
Fantasy video games
Koei games
Nintendo Switch games
Nippon Ichi Software games
PlayStation 2 games
PlayStation Network games
Single-player video games
Tactical role-playing video games
Video games developed in Japan
Video games featuring protagonists of selectable gender
Video games scored by Tenpei Sato
Windows games